Jeffery D. Ball (born April 17, 1969) is the Assistant Coach of the Atlantic Cape Community College baseball team.  He is the former assistant general manager of the Atlantic City Surf professional baseball team, Ball took the position on March 21, 2007 after being the team's field manager for the previous three seasons.

He was enrolled in the San Jose State University.

External links

Pelota Binaria (Venezuelan Winter League)

1969 births
Living people
American expatriate baseball players in Canada
American expatriate baseball players in Japan
American expatriate baseball players in Mexico
Atlantic City Surf players
Auburn Astros players
Baseball coaches from California
Baseball players from California
Fresno Grizzlies players
Hiroshima Toyo Carp players
Jackson Generals (Texas League) players
Langosteros de Cancún players
Major League Baseball first basemen
Merced Blue Devils baseball players
Mexican League baseball first basemen
Mexican League baseball right fielders
Mexican League baseball third basemen
Minor league baseball managers
Navegantes del Magallanes players
American expatriate baseball players in Venezuela
Newark Bears players
Nippon Professional Baseball first basemen
Osceola Astros players
People from Merced, California
Phoenix Firebirds players
Quad Cities River Bandits players
San Francisco Giants players
San Jose State Spartans baseball players
Tucson Toros players
Vancouver Canadians players
Junior college baseball coaches in the United States